Ardmore Avenue station is a SEPTA rapid transit station in Ardmore, Pennsylvania. It serves the Norristown High Speed Line, and is located at Ardmore Avenue and Haverford Road. Local, Hughes Park Express, and Norristown Express trains all stop at Ardmore Avenue. The station has off-street parking available.

Station layout

History
The Ardmore station of the Philadelphia and Western Railroad opened in 1907.

References

External links

 Ardmore Avenue entrance from Google Maps Street View

SEPTA Norristown High Speed Line stations
Railway stations in the United States opened in 1907